Gaganvihari Lallubhai Mehta (1900–1974) was the ambassador of India to the United States from 1952 to 1958.

Biography 
Metha was son of Lallubhai Samaldas, he graduated from Bombay University before studying at the London School of Economics. He worked at the assistant editor of the Bombay Chronicle from 1923 to 1925 before working for the Scindia Steam Navigation Company. After India gained its independence from the United Kingdom, he became the president of the Tariff Board before becoming the ambassador of India to the United States from 1952 to 1958.

Mehta was awarded the Padma Vibhushan in 1959. He was refused service in a Houston airport restaurant because he was not white, leading John Foster Dulles to conclude that US segregation was hurting foreign relations.

References

Ambassadors of India to the United States
Recipients of the Padma Vibhushan in social work
1900 births
1974 deaths
Alumni of the London School of Economics